Serena Williams was the defending champion, but she chose not to compete that year.

Daniela Hantuchová won her maiden WTA Tour singles title, defeating Martina Hingis in the final 6–3, 6–4.

This was the first WTA tournament in which future world No. 1 and five-time Grand Slam champion Maria Sharapova competed. She was defeated in the second round by Monica Seles.

Seeds
All seeds received a bye into the second round.

Draw

Finals

Top half

Section 1

Section 2

Section 3

Section 4

Bottom half

Section 5

Section 6

Section 7

Section 8

Qualifying

Qualifying seeds

Qualifiers

Lucky loser
  Samantha Reeves

Qualifying draw

First qualifier

Second qualifier

Third qualifier

Fourth qualifier

Fifth qualifier

Sixth qualifier

Seventh qualifier

Eighth qualifier

Ninth qualifier

Tenth qualifier

Eleventh qualifier

Twelfth qualifier

References

External links
 Official results archive (ITF)
 Official results archive (WTA)

Women's Singles
2002 WTA Tour